The 1948 South Dakota gubernatorial election was held on November 2, 1948. Incumbent Republican Governor George T. Mickelson ran for re-election to a second term. He was opposed by Democrat Harold J. Volz, a businessman and the former Chairman of the Tripp County Democratic Party. Both Mickelson and Volz were the only candidates of their parties to file for Governor, ensuring that they won their respective nominations unopposed and removing the race from the primary ballot. In the general election, Mickelson had little difficulty defeating Volz. Though Republican presidential nominee Thomas E. Dewey only narrowly won the state over President Harry S. Truman, Mickelson's popularity allowed him to win re-election in a landslide, receiving 61% of the vote to Volz's 39%.

General election

Results

References

Bibliography
 

1948
South Dakota
Gubernatorial
November 1948 events in the United States